Toloo High School (Persian: موسسه فرهنگی طلوع), also known as the Toloo Cultural Institute, is a girls-only school located in the north of Tehran, Iran. Toloo (toloo=طلوع ) means sunrise.

Hundreds of members of the Iranian political or religious elite have sent their daughters to this school, which is famous for its high-quality education, but importantly extreme emphasis on Islam and Shia religious values and thoughts.

Admissions 
Toloo High School remains one of the difficult schools to gain admission to. The school's admissions process includes an examination and then an interview.  The entrance examination includes Mathematics and Sciences.  The competition is not many are invited back for interviews.  The interviews are designed to examine the student's social and religious core, as well as the parents'.  What they look for are upper class or highly educated middle-class families with strong religious convictions.

Reputation
Similarly to Nikan High School, the boys-only school, Toloo provides a high quality of education. However its popularity is mostly due to its exclusivity and emphasis on tradition and religion.

The school has a reputation in pressurising parents and students alike. It can be argued that because of its over exclusivity, some students might find it hard to integrate into the wider society.

References

High schools in Iran
Girls' schools in Iran
Schools in Tehran
Educational institutions with year of establishment missing